Color is the third studio album by Japanese group NEWS, released on November 19, 2008. The album was released in a limited edition and regular edition. The regular edition comes with a bonus track. The album debuted at the number-one spot on the Oricon chart, making Color their third consecutive number-one album.

Singles
"Weeeek": On November 7, 2007, NEWS released "Weeeek", their seventh single, along with their second studio album, Pacific. Weeeek debuted on the top of the charts with a combined sale of 262,715, giving NEWS their seventh consecutive number-one single.

Track listing

| music5          = 
| length5         = 4:33
| title6          = Mola
| lyrics6         = Daisuke "DI" Imai
| music6          = Daisuke "DI" Imai
| length6         = 3:32
| title7          = 
| lyrics7         = Azuki
| music7          = 
| length7         = 5:55
| title8          = Ordinary
| lyrics8         = Ryo Nishikido
| music8          = Ryo Nishikido
| length8         = 3:37
| title9          = 
| lyrics9         = Zopp
| music9          = her0ism
| length9         = 4:20
| title10         = 
| lyrics10        = 
| music10         = Tomoya Kinoshita
| length10        = 4:00
| title11         = 
| lyrics11        = 
| music11         = Michio Kawano
| length11        = 4:21
| title12         = Smile Maker
| lyrics12        = 0 Soul 7
| music12         = 0 Soul 7
| length12        = 3:51
| title13         = Happy Birthday
| lyrics13        = Seamo
| music13         = Seamo, Shintaro "Growth" Izutsu
| length13        = 3:48
| title14         = Fly Again
| lyrics14        = Azuki
| music14         = her0ism
| length14        = 3:25
}}

Charts

References

External links
Official website 

2008 albums
News (band) albums